Unarthupattu is a 1980 Malayalam film directed by P. A. Backer.

References

External links
 

1980s Malayalam-language films
Films directed by P. A. Backer